Pietro Calvi was the lead ship of its class of two submarines built for the  (Royal Italian Navy) during the 1930s. Completed in 1936, she played a minor role in the Spanish Civil War of 1936–1939 supporting the Spanish Nationalists. The submarine made multiple patrols in the Atlantic Ocean during the Second World War, sinking seven Allied ships. Pietro Calvi was rammed and sunk by a British convoy escort in July 1942.

Design and description 
The Calvi class was an improved and enlarged version of the preceding  submarine cruisers. They displaced  surfaced and  submerged. Their crew numbered 77 officers and enlisted men.

For surface running, the boats were powered by two  diesel engines, each driving one propeller shaft. When submerged each propeller was driven by a  electric motor. They could reach  on the surface and  underwater.

The boats were armed with eight  torpedo tubes, four each in the bow and in the stern for which they carried a total of 16 torpedoes. They were also armed with a pair of  deck guns, one each fore and aft of the conning tower, for combat on the surface. Their anti-aircraft armament consisted of two twin-gun mounts for  machine guns.

Construction and career 
Pietro Calvi (pennant number CV) was built by Odero-Terni-Orlando at their Muggiano, La Spezia, shipyard. Laid down in 1932, the submarine was launched on 31 March 1935 and completed in 1936.

During the Spanish Civil War, she unsuccessfully fired a pair of torpedoes each at the  mail steamer  and the 3946 GRT mail steamer  during a patrol on 1–17 January 1937. During the night of 12/13 January she bombarded the port of Valencia.

The first patrol during the Second World War was from Liguria to the Atlantic Ocean, and lasted from 3 July to 6 August 1940.  After overhaul at La Spezia, Pietro Calvi sailed on 6 October for a second Atlantic patrol reaching Bordeaux, France, on 23 October.  The submarine suffered storm damage during its third patrol off the British Isles from 3 to 31 December. The fourth patrol was between the Canary Islands and the Azores from 31 March to 13 May 1941. She sailed on 1 August for a fifth patrol off the Canary Islands. During the sixth patrol from 7 to 29 December Pietro Calvi,  and  rescued sailors of the sunken German commerce raider . The seventh patrol was off Brazil from 7 March to 29 April 1942. The submarine sailed on 2 July for its eighth patrol. Pietro Calvi was rammed and sunk on 14 July by the British sloop  which was able to briefly board the submarine before she sank. British ships rescued 35 of her crew of 78 men; among those killed was the commanding officer, Commander Primo Longobardo.

Notes

References

External links 
 Pietro Calvi Marina Militare website

Calvi-class submarines
Ships built in Italy
1935 ships
World War II submarines of Italy
World War II shipwrecks in the Atlantic Ocean